Aegilops is a genus of Eurasian and North American plants in the grass family, Poaceae. They are known generally as goatgrasses. Some species are known as invasive weeds in parts of North America.

Description
These are annual plants, sometimes from rhizomes. The taller species reach about 80 centimeters in maximum height. The flat leaves are linear to narrowly lance-shaped, and are up to 15 centimeters long and one wide. The inflorescence is a spike with 2 to 12 solitary spikelets each up to 1.2 centimeters long. Some spikelets have one or three awns, and some have none.

Wheat
Genus Aegilops has played an important role in the taxonomy of wheat. The familiar common wheat (Triticum aestivum) arose when cultivated emmer wheat hybridized with Aegilops tauschii about 8,000 years ago. Aegilops and Triticum are genetically similar, as evidenced by their ability to hybridize, and by the presence of Aegilops in the evolutionary heritage of many Triticum taxa. Aegilops is sometimes treated within Triticum. They are maintained as separate genera by most authorities because of their ecological characteristics, and because when united they do not form a monophyletic group (the lowest common class will need to include some other genera).

Ecology
Some Aegilops are known as weeds. A. cylindrica, which is commonly known as jointed goatgrass, infests wheat fields, where it outcompetes wheat plants, reducing yields. Its seeds mix with wheat grains at harvest, lowering the quality of the crop. It can also harbor pests such as the Russian wheat aphid (Diuraphis noxia) and pathogenic fungi. Other Aegilops are weeds of rangeland and wildland habitat.

Prehistoric use as a wild food source
During the Mesolithic era, nomadic peoples found goatgrasses (Aegilops) growing wild, along with wild wheats and barleys, and harvested them using bone sickles inset with sharp flakes of flint. The harvested plants were left to dry for a few days, then the edible grains were separated out from the rest of the plant material by beating the plants with a wooden flail, or by rolling them against a hard surface. The seeds were then carefully singed in the embers of a fire to burn away the remaining non-edible plant material. Some grains were accidentally burnt, and since the charred grains do not biodegrade some have been found by modern archeologists.

Etymology
The genus name Aegilops comes from the Greek , which could mean "a goat", "goatlike", "a herb liked by goats", or perhaps "a grass similar to that liked by goats". The word "Aegilops" is claimed to be the longest word in the English language to have all of its letters in alphabetical order, and with no letters repeated.

Species

 Accepted species
 Aegilops bicornis - Egypt, Libya, Cyprus, Lebanon, Syria, Palestine, Sinai, Jordan, Israel Kuwait
 Aegilops biuncialis - Mediterranean Basin, Rumenia, Ukrain, Caucasus
 Aegilops caudata - Balkans, Middle East
 Aegilops columnaris - Middle East
 Aegilops comosa - Greece, Turkey
 Aegilops crassa – Persian goatgrass - Middle East to Central Asia
 Aegilops cylindrica – jointed goatgrass - from Czech Republic to Pakistan
 Aegilops geniculata - from Portugal + Canary Islands to Iran
 Aegilops × insulae-cypri  - Cyprus
 Aegilops juvenalis - from Turkey to Kazakhstan
 Aegilops kotschyi – ovate goatgrass - from Tunisia to Uzbekistan
 Aegilops longissima - Middle East, Egypt
 Aegilops lorentii - from Spain + Cape Verde to Iran
 Aegilops mutica - Turkey, Transcaucasus
 Aegilops neglecta – three-awned goatgrass - from Portugal + Canary Islands to Kazakhstan
 Aegilops peregrina - from Morocco to Iran
 Aegilops searsii - Syria, Jordan
 Aegilops sharonensis - Israel
 Aegilops speltoides  - from Greece to Iran
 Aegilops tauschii - from Crimea to Henan
 Aegilops triuncialis – barbed goatgrass - from Portugal + Morocco to Kazakhstan
 Aegilops umbellulata - from Crimea to Iran
 Aegilops uniaristata - Italy, Balkans, Turkey, Caucasus
 Aegilops vavilovii - from Caucasus to Saudi Arabia
 Aegilops ventricosa - from Morocco + Balearic Islands to Caucasus

 Formerly included species
Species once regarded as members of Aegilops but now considered better suited to other genera: Ctenium, Dactyloctenium, Elymus, Eremochloa, Ophiuros, Parapholis, Rottboellia, and Triticum

See also
 List of Poaceae genera

References

External links

 
Poaceae genera